Seong-nam, also spelled Sung-nam or Song-nam, is a Korean masculine given name. Its meaning differs based on the hanja used to write each syllable of the name. There are 27 hanja with the reading "seong" and five hanja with the reading "nam" on the South Korean government's official list of hanja which may be registered for use in given names. One pair of hanja used to write the name (成男) also correspond to a number of Japanese given names, including Shigeo and Naruo.

People with this name include:
Hong Song-nam (1929–2009), North Korean politician
Kim Sung-nam (born 1954), South Korean footballer
Lee Seong-nam (born 1977 as Denis Laktionov), naturalised South Korean footballer originally from Russia
O Song-nam (born 1982), North Korean freestyle wrestler
Ahn Sung-nam (born 1984), South Korean footballer
Kim Song-nam, North Korean table tennis player

See also
List of Korean given names

References

Korean masculine given names